Airick Journey Crabill (born Airick Leonard West in 1979) is an American education reform advocate and public speaker on education reform. He currently serves as the national school board governance leader at the Council of the Great City Schools. Prior to this position, he was Texas Education Agency's Deputy Commissioner for Governance. Crabill served eight years (2008–2016) on the board of the Kansas City Public Schools, serving as president for a majority of his tenure.

Early life 
West was born in Kansas City, Missouri in 1979. He was raised in and out of foster care. Although he struggled without a stable home, he graduated high school and attended the University of Kansas. He left school early to pursue a job in the computer industry. For a while, he worked for a web development firm after which, he founded his own firm.

He later moved to the Ivanhoe neighborhood in Kansas City, joining the Ivanhoe Neighborhood Council, and becoming involved in the efforts to revitalize the struggling neighborhood. He has also helped raise several young men in the neighborhood, giving them a place to stay when they are in need and allowing many of the kids in the neighborhood access to a computer during the day. West was also involved in mentorship programs in several schools in the city.

Career

School Board Member 
In the first half of 2008, he ran for a seat on the board of the Kansas City, Missouri School District. He obtained a sufficient number of signatures to be placed on the ballot. He had previously served on the boards of the Ivanhoe Neighborhood Council, Gordon Parks Elementary School, Stephanie Waterman Foundation, Simply Equine Assisted Therapy, and University of Missouri Extension. He was also the originator of "The Ivanhoe Project," a program at the Kansas City School of Urban Education that placed teachers training to work in urban-area schools in inner-city residences to expose them to the environments their students come from.

After he was elected to the school board, he was later appointed school board president in 2010. As president, he led a community outreach effort to promote the newly restructured school district. He along with other board members and volunteers called district residents by phone and knocked on doors to directly engage with residents.

In August 2011, the school district superintendent John Covington suddenly resigned. Some on the board blamed West for the resignation, accusing him of being too directly involved in the operations of the school district and frustrating the superintendent. It was not until a few years later that Covington clarified to The Kansas City Star that the decision to leave was not in any way motivated by West's actions. Following this incident, West briefly resigned his presidency on the board but remained as a member. Only a month later in September 2011, he was re-elected as president by a 7–1 vote.

In March 2012, he was again part of the direct community outreach program to re-enroll students that had dropped out of school, part of an effort to regain the school district's accreditation. In April 2012, he was re-elected to the at-large seat on the school board for another four-year term. Efforts to achieve higher enrollment levels continued in his new term with more door-to-door efforts to educate parents and register students for the school year beginning in August 2013.

In 2013, West received the year's local Consensus Civility Award given by a non-profit group Consensus. He was also a finalist for the Top Urban Educator of the Year Award, which is awarded by the Council of the Great City Schools. In 2014, Missouri State School Board announced that the Kansan City School District had regained provisional accreditation. In 2016, West elected not to run again for a seat on the school board, ending his tenure on April 13. He had served eight years on the board. During his tenure, the school district made several academic and operational improvements. An audit of the school district's finances returned no concerns compared to nineteen problem areas in 2008.

Texas Deputy Commissioner of Education 
In early 2016, West officially changed his name to Airick Journey Crabill as part of an adult adoption, taking the last name of his childhood foster parents and choosing the middle name Journey which he says signifies "the journey God put him on"

In April 2016, the new Texas Commissioner of Education Mike Morath appointed Crabill as one of his Deputy Commissioners. According to the Texas Education Agency (TEA) website, Crabill is in charge of the agency's efforts to improve schools and ensure accreditation as the Deputy Commissioner of Governance. His full list of responsibilities originally included "school improvement, charters, governance, complaints management, system support & innovation, investigations, school discipline/safety, accreditation, waivers, and districts of innovation," but was curtailed later to include only "enforcement & support and governance & investigations." According to Crabill, as he frequently states, his main focus is "improving student outcomes".

In his role, Crabill developed and frequently facilitates leadership and governance training sessions to educate current and potential school administrators and board members on how to better execute the responsibilities of their positions. At times, his workshops are obligatory as part of the conditions for approval of the improvement plans submitted by underperforming schools. In November 2016, Crabill sent a letter to eleven school boards of under-performing districts requiring that they undergo training to adjust their plans to improve their respective districts. All of the school boards agreed to the training while several did so begrudgingly. However, the workshops were well-received with board members in attendance expressing their hopeful outlook on the future of interactions with the TEA.

References

External links
 
 Application for employment at the Texas Education Agency

Living people
People from Joplin, Missouri
Texas Education Agency
Education in Kansas City, Missouri
Education in Jackson County, Missouri
1979 births
School board members in Missouri
Adult adoptees